Ngoma is a settlement in the Caprivi Region of Namibia. It is one of the border posts between Namibia and Botswana, traffic crosses the border at Ngoma bridge over the Chobe River.

Populated places in the Zambezi Region
Botswana–Namibia border crossings